Doli is a 1969 Hindi-language film written and directed by Adurthi Subba Rao and stars Rajesh Khanna and Babita.

This film is counted among the 17 consecutive hit films of Rajesh Khanna between 1969 and 1971, by adding the two hero films Marayada and Andaz to the 15 consecutive solo hits he gave from 1969 to 1971. The film was a remake of the Telugu film Thene Manasulu.

Plot

The story follows two college friends; Amar and Prem, whose lives get entangled with two neighbors; Asha and Shobha. Shobha's father steals dowry money and the theft is blamed on Asha's father. Both girls marry their respective partners. Shobha's husband travels away and returns with the need for a new wife. Amar falls for Asha not knowing that he left her at the wedding altar and that she is his wife (he refused to look at her face). Lies, treachery, deception and intrigue follow the tale as Asha strives to clear her father's name of a crime he didn't commit and Amar falls for Asha, not knowing that the girl he cruelly rejected during his brash younger days is the same girl he is falling for now.

Cast

Soundtrack
The soundtrack was composed by Ravi and lyrics were penned by Rajendra Krishan.

References

External links
 

1969 films
1960s Hindi-language films
1969 romantic drama films
Indian romantic drama films
Films scored by Ravi
Hindi remakes of Telugu films
Films directed by Adurthi Subba Rao